Cloud albedo is a measure of the albedo or reflectivity of a cloud. Clouds regulate the amount of solar radiation absorbed by a planet and its solar surface irradiance. Generally, increased cloud cover correlates to a higher albedo and a lower absorption of solar energy. Cloud albedo strongly influences the Earth's energy budget, accounting for approximately half of Earth's albedo. Cloud albedo depends on the total mass of water, the size and shape of the droplets or particles and their distribution in space. Thick clouds (such as stratocumulus) reflect a large amount of incoming solar radiation, translating to a high albedo. Thin clouds (such as cirrus) tend to transmit more solar radiation and, therefore, have a low albedo. Changes in cloud albedo caused by variations in cloud properties have a significant effect on global climate.

Cloud condensation nuclei and cloud albedo 
On a microscopic scale, clouds are formed through the condensation of water on cloud condensation nuclei, such as pollution and aerosol particles. The size, concentration, structure, and chemical composition of these particles influence cloud albedo. For example, black carbon aerosol particles absorb more solar radiation and sulfate aerosol reflects more solar radiation. Smaller particles form smaller cloud droplets, which tend to decrease precipitation efficiency of a cloud, increasing cloud albedo. Additionally, more cloud condensation nuclei increases the size of a cloud and the amount of reflected solar radiation.

Causes of cloud albedo variation 
Cloud albedo on a planet varies from less than 10% to more than 90% and depends on drop sizes, liquid water or ice content, thickness of the cloud, solar zenith angle, etc.

Liquid Water Path 
A cloud's liquid water path varies with changing cloud droplet size, which may alter the behavior of clouds and their albedo. The variations of the albedo of typical clouds in the atmosphere are dominated by the column amount of liquid water and ice in the cloud. The smaller the drops and the greater the liquid water content, the greater the cloud albedo, if all other factors are constant.

The Twomey Effect (Aerosol Indirect Effect) 

The Twomey Effect is increased cloud albedo due to cloud nuclei from pollution. Increasing aerosol concentration and aerosol density leads to higher cloud droplet concentration, smaller cloud droplets, and higher cloud albedo. In macrophysically identical clouds, a cloud with few larger drops will have a lower albedo than a cloud with more smaller drops. The smaller cloud particles similarly increase cloud albedo by reducing precipitation and prolonging the lifetime of a cloud. This subsequently increases cloud albedo as solar radiation is reflected over a longer period of time. The Albrecht Effect is the related concept of increased cloud lifetime from cloud nuclei.

Zenith Angle 
Cloud albedo increases with the total water content or depth of the cloud and the solar zenith angle. The variation of albedo with zenith angle is most rapid when the sun is near the horizon, and least when the sun is overhead. Absorption of solar radiation by plane-parallel clouds decreases with increasing zenith angle because radiation that is reflected to space at the higher zenith angles penetrates less deeply into the cloud and is therefore less likely to be absorbed.

Influence on global climate 
Cloud albedo indirectly affects global climate through solar radiation scattering and absorption in Earth's radiation budget. Variations in cloud albedo cause atmospheric instability that influences the hydrological cycle, weather patterns, and atmospheric circulation. These effects are parameterized by cloud radiative forcing, a measure of short-wave and long-wave radiation in relation to cloud cover. The Earth Radiation Budget Experiment demonstrated that small variations in cloud coverage, structure, altitude, droplet size, and phase have significant effects on the climate. A five percent increase in short-wave reflection from clouds would counteract the greenhouse effect of the past two-hundred years.

Cloud Albedo-Climate Feedback Loops 
There are a variety of positive and negative cloud albedo-climate feedback loops in cloud and climate models. An exampled of a negative cloud-climate feedback loop is that as a planet warms, cloudiness increases, which increases a planet's albedo. An increase in albedo reduces absorbed solar radiation and leads to cooling. A counteracting positive feedback loop considers the rising of the high cloud layer, reduction in the vertical distribution of cloudiness, and decreased albedo.

Air pollution can result in variation in cloud condensation nuclei, creating a feedback loop that influences atmospheric temperature, relative humility, and cloud formation depending on cloud and regional characteristics. For example, increased sulfate aerosols can reduce precipitation efficiency, resulting in a positive feedback loop in which decreased precipitation efficiency increases aerosol atmospheric longevity. On the other hand, a negative feedback loop can be established in mixed-phase clouds in which black carbon aerosol can increase ice phase precipitation formation and reduce aerosol concentrations.

References

Atmospheric radiation
Clouds
Satellite meteorology